Burnupena pubescens is a species of sea snail, a marine gastropod mollusk in the family Buccinidae, the true whelks.

Description
The size of an adult shell varies between 40 mm and 50 mm. Very similar to B. papyracea. Also often covered with the encrusting bryozoan Alcyonidium nodosum and differs mainly in being smaller and having fine longitudinal ridges which cross the spirals to produce a slightly checkered effect, generally not visible under the bryozoan.

The ovate shell is elongated and subturreted. It is generally of a clear fawn color, marked with numerous spots of a deep chestnut or reddish color, oblong or quadrangular, alternating with other similar spots of a dull white. The first, oftentimes, form longitudinal bands. The pointed spire is conical and, formed of six slightly convex whorls, the lowest of which is as large as all the others. They are flattened and angular at the upper part, crowned upon the angle by a subgranulated margin.  The suture is accompanied at the upper part of each whorl, by a small, slightly convex and undulating margin. Upon the body whorl are seen nine rounded, transverse, very angular folds. The other whorls are also ornamented with three folds. The spaces between them bear fine transverse striae. The aperture is white, ovate and elongated. The thick columella is rounded, white and almost straight. The right edge is thin, and slightly sharp.

Distribution
This marine species is found in South African waters off Namibia and KwaZuluNatal.

References

 Kilburn R.N. (1972). Taxonomic notes on South African marine Mollusca, with the description of new species and subspecies of Conus, Nassarius, Vexillum and Demoulia. Annals of the Natal Museum 21(2):391–437
 Branch, G.M. et al. (2002). Two Oceans. 5th impression. David Philip, Cate Town & Johannesburg

External links
 

Buccinidae
Gastropods described in 1858